Longsang Zhuang is an underdescribed Northern Tai language spoken in Longsang Township 隆桑镇, Debao County, Guangxi, China.

Although its autonym and exonym are both A1-G, it is completely distinct from Yang Zhuang, a Central Tai language (Liao 2016:377).

Distribution
Within Longsang Township 隆桑镇, Debao County, Guangxi, China, Longsang Zhuang is spoken in the following villages (Liao 2016:377-382).
Sanhe (三合屯;  in Zhuang), Qiaotou Village (桥头村)
Qiaonan (桥南屯 C1 C1 in Zhuang) village, Qiaotou Village (桥头村)
Daji Village (大吉村)
Longtan (龙坛屯;  in Zhuang), Longtan Village (龙坛村)
Longyuan (龙苑屯), Longtan Village (龙坛村)

References

Sources
Liao Hanbo. 2016. Tonal development of Tai languages. M.A. dissertation. Chiang Mai: Payap University.

Tai languages